Khmara Island is a small island lying  south of Haswell Island, Queen Mary Coast, Antarctica. It was mapped from aerial photos taken by U.S. Navy Operation Highjump, 1946–47. It was remapped by the Soviet Antarctic Expedition, 1956, and named after tractor driver Ivan F. Khmara.

See also 
 List of antarctic and sub-antarctic islands
 Khmara Bay

References

Islands of Queen Mary Land